Marriage by Contract is a 1928 American drama film directed by James Flood and starring Patsy Ruth Miller, Lawrence Gray and Robert Edeson. It was one of the first sound films produced by Tiffany Pictures, one of the largest independent studios in Hollywood at the time, and was followed by Lucky Boy.

Cast
 Patsy Ruth Miller as Margaret 
 Lawrence Gray as Don 
 Robert Edeson as Winters 
 Ralph Emerson as Arthur 
 Shirley Palmer as Molly 
 John St. Polis as Father 
 Claire McDowell as Mother 
 Ruby Lafayette as Grandma 
 Duke Martin as Dirke 
 Raymond Keane as Drury

References

Bibliography
  Donald Crafton. The Talkies: American Cinema's Transition to Sound, 1926-1931. University of California Press, 1999.

External links
 

1928 films
1928 drama films
1920s English-language films
Silent American drama films
Films directed by James Flood
Tiffany Pictures films
American silent feature films
American black-and-white films
1920s American films